Willem Nicolaas Frederik du Plessis (born 5 June 1990) is a South African rugby union player, currently playing in France with the French Top 14 side . His regular position is fly-half. He plays for Netherlands at international level.

Career

Youth
He played for the  team in the 2009 Under-19 Provincial Championship and for the  team in the 2010 Under-21 Provincial Championship, scoring 96 points in twelve matches. He was named in the Sharks' squad for the 2011 Vodacom Cup competition, but failed to make an appearance. He made two more appearances for the Sharks in the 2011 Under-21 Provincial Championship, before returning to the  team for the latter part of the competition, making a further four appearances.

Blue Bulls
He also appeared as a substitute in two of their remaining fixtures in the competition.

Du Plessis weighed in with two tries and fifteen conversions (missing just one attempt), scoring 40 points in one match, a Vodacom Cup record.

Free State Cheetahs

Golden Lions

Return to Cheetahs
However, Du Plessis's time in Johannesburg was short-lived and he returned to Bloemfontein for the 2015 Super Rugby season, signing a contract until the end of 2016.

Toulon
In August 2015, Du Plessis joined French Top 14 side  as a medical joker on a three-month loan deal.

Bayonne
Du Plessis joined  in November 2015 as a medical joker, before signing a full-time contract a month later, signing a three-year deal starting in the 2016–17 season.

Varsity Cup

References

South African rugby union players
South African expatriates in France
Dutch rugby union players
Expatriate rugby union players in France
Living people
1990 births
Rugby union players from Pretoria
Blue Bulls players
Free State Cheetahs players
Golden Lions players
Rugby union fly-halves